This is a list of volcanoes that have had large explosive eruptions during the Holocene (since about 11,650 years Before Present), with a VEI of 5 or higher, or plume height of at least 30 km. To date, there have been no eruptions with a confirmed VEI of 8 in the Holocene, and only a few VEI-7 eruptions are thought to have occurred during this time, with the most recent being the 1815 eruption of Mount Tambora. This is not a complete list.

List

See also 
Year Without a Summer
Volcanic winter of 536
List of largest volcanic eruptions
List of Quaternary volcanic eruptions
Timeline of volcanism on Earth

References 

Holocene
Volcanic events by period